CCGS Thunder Cape  is one of the Canadian Coast Guard's 36 s. She was built in Kingston, Ontario, in 2000, by MetalCraft Marine and MIL Systems and was moved to Goderich, Ontario, in October 2005. Assigned to the Central and Arctic Region, the lifeboat serves the Lake Erie area. The boat is backed up by search and rescue operations from 424 Transport and Rescue Squadron (at CFB Trenton). The Thunder Cape was damaged in a collision with the breakwater at the outlet of the Mission River in Thunder Bay.

Design
It contains two computer-operated Detroit DDEC-III 6V-92TA diesel engines providing a combined 870 shaft horsepower. It has two  four-blade propellers, and its complement is four crew members and five passengers.

Communication options include Raytheon 152 HF-SSB and Motorola Spectra 9000 VHF50W radios, and a Raytheon RAY 430 loudhailer system. The boat also supports the Simrad TD-L1550 VHF-FM radio direction finder. Raytheon provides a number of other electronic systems for the lifeboat, including the RAYCHART 620, the ST 30 heading indicator and ST 50 depth indicator, the NAV 398 global positioning system, a RAYPILOT 650 autopilot system, and either the R41X AN or SPS-69 radar systems.

References

External links

Official site

Cape-class motor lifeboats
2000 ships
Ships built in Ontario
Ships of the Canadian Coast Guard